Diepold or Dipold is a Germanic dithematic name, a variant of Theobald. Notable people with this name include:

Diepold of Berg
Diepold III, Margrave of Vohburg
Dipold, Count of Acerra
Diepold II

Germanic given names
German masculine given names